The role of women in speculative fiction has changed a great deal since the early to mid-20th century. There are several aspects to women's roles, including their participation as authors of speculative fiction and their role in science fiction fandom. Regarding authorship, in 1948, 10–15% of science fiction writers were female. Women's role in speculative fiction (including science fiction) has grown since then, and in 1999, women comprised 36% of the Science Fiction and Fantasy Writers of America's professional members. Frankenstein  (1818) by Mary Shelley has been called the first science fiction novel, although women wrote utopian novels even before that, with Margaret Cavendish publishing the first (The Blazing World) in the seventeenth century. Early published fantasy was written by and for any gender. However, speculative fiction, with science fiction in particular, has traditionally been viewed as a male-oriented genre.

Women have been active in science fiction fandom for a number of decades.

Writers
Science fiction originally had a reputation of being created by men for other men, though the genre had women writers, such as Clare Winger Harris, Miriam Allen deFord, and Gertrude Barrows Bennett, from the beginning. Until the late 1960s, women did not win major science fiction awards, such as the Hugos. The 1966 "Analog Science Fiction and Fact All-Time Poll" did not list any novels by women and the 1973 "Locus All-Time Favorite Authors Poll" was over 90% male. One of the two women in Locus's poll, Andre Norton, had been "gender ambiguous" for many of her readers. Other female writers of the era, such as C. L. Moore and Leigh Brackett, also used ambiguous or male names. Women who wrote under their own names, such as Zenna Henderson, initially wrote more "domestic" material concerning teachers and mothers. A partial exception was Katherine MacLean, who wrote sociology- and psychology-oriented fiction and rarely used a male name.

Eric Leif Davin argues in Partners in Wonder that science fiction's "male-oriented" reputation is unjustified and that it was a "safe haven" for outsiders, including women. Davin reports that only L. Taylor Hansen concealed her sex in early years, and that C. L. Moore wanted to hide her career as a science fiction author from her job.

Women writers were in a minority: during the '50s and '60s, almost 1,000 stories published in science fiction magazines by over 200 female-identified authors between 1926 and 1960 were documented, making women writers 10-15% of contributors. His is a minority view, "at odds with the common perception of science fiction".

The advent of second wave feminism in the 1960s, combined with the growing view of science fiction as the literature of ideas, led to an influx of female science fiction writers, and some saw this influx as the first appearance of women into the genre. In the 1960s and 1970s, authors such as Ursula K. Le Guin (who debuted in 1963) and Joanna Russ (who debuted in the 1950s) began to consciously explore feminist themes in works such as The Left Hand of Darkness and The Female Man, creating a self-consciously feminist science fiction.

As of 2013, publisher statistics indicate that men still outnumber women about two to one among English-language speculative fiction writers aiming for professional publication, but that the percentages vary considerably by genre. The following numbers are based on the 503 submissions received by Tor Books, a major science fiction and fantasy publisher, between January and July 2013.

Nine women have been named Grand Master of science fiction by the Science Fiction and Fantasy Writers of America:
 Andre Norton (1984)
 Ursula K. Le Guin (2003)
 Anne McCaffrey (2005)
 Connie Willis (2012)
 C.J. Cherryh (2016)
 Jane Yolen (2017)
 Lois McMaster Bujold (2020)
 Nalo Hopkinson (2021)
 Mercedes Lackey (2022)

Doris Lessing, who wrote the five-novel science fiction series Canopus in Argos, received the 2007 Nobel Prize in Literature.

The Encyclopedia of Science Fiction lists three notable women authors of military science fiction: Lois McMaster Bujold; Elizabeth Moon (particularly her Familias Regnant stories such as Hunting Party (1993)), and Karen Traviss.

Fans
Women have been active in science fiction fandom for some time, and the Oxford Dictionary of Science Fiction dates the coinage "femfan" (sometimes: "femme fan") to as early as 1944.   Leigh Brackett says of the history of women in SF "There always were a certain number of women fans and women readers." Labalestier quotes the editor of Startling Stories, writing in 1953, as saying

A 1958 self-reported If survey found that 31% of respondents were women, which the editors said was "surprisingly high (at least to us)". Robert Silverberg said "probably the first appearance of the 'Women in Science Fiction' panel soon to become a fixture of these conventions" was at the 10th World Science Fiction Convention in 1953; which was also the first World Science Fiction Convention chaired by a woman, author Julian May.

While science fiction fandom has been an organized phenomenon for decades—presaging the organized fandoms of other genres and media—the study of science fiction fandom within cultural studies and science fiction studies is relatively new. Consequently, assertions about the prevalence of women in fandom are largely anecdotal and personal, and sometimes contradictory. Most prominent among these assertions is the claim that it was the advent of the original Star Trek television series which brought large quantities of women into fandom. This claim is critically analyzed by Davin, who finds it poorly founded, and cites a long history of female involvement in fandom decades prior to Star Trek; Larbalestier also cites women active in science fiction fandom before the late 1960s and early 1970s.

However, women became more visibly present in fandom, and more organized, in the 1970s. The slash movement among fans began, as far as anyone can tell, with Diane Marchant's publication of the first known Star Trek "Kirk/Spock" story in Grup #3 in 1974. 1974 also saw the creation of The Witch and the Chameleon, the first explicitly feminist fanzine. The fanzine Khatru published a "Women in Science Fiction" symposium in 1975 (one of the "males" who participated was James Tiptree, Jr.). In 1976, Susan Wood set up a panel on "women and science fiction" at MidAmericon, the 1976 Worldcon; this ultimately led to the founding of A Women's APA, the first women's amateur press association. Also in 1976, WisCon, the world's leading—and for many years, only—feminist science fiction convention and conference was founded: an annual conference in Madison, Wisconsin. In turn, as a result of discussions at WisCon, institutions such as the Tiptree Awards and Broad Universe arose to address questions of gender in speculative fiction and issues peculiar to women writers of speculative fiction. Some of the same people involved in creating WisCon also founded the feminist fanzine Janus, which was thrice nominated for the Hugo Award for Best Fanzine (1978–1980).

However, the perception of speculative fiction as mainly a men's genre continues to be widespread. As the inclusion of women within science fiction and fantasy more broadly has become obvious, the specificity of the perception has evolved. For instance, the still widely held view that "science fiction and fantasy are men's genres" has been refined by some to distinguish between science fiction as a genre mainly appealing to men, and fantasy, which is generally seen as being more accommodating to women (some subgenres, particularly urban fantasy, with female protagonists, and paranormal romance are seen as being more popular with women than with men). Little formal study has supported any of these distinctions, whether based on readers, writers, or characters.

This perception has often been upheld and enforced by men, perhaps to protect themselves from what fandom researcher Henry Jenkins called the stereotype that “men are feminized and/or desexualized through their intimate engagement with mass culture”. However, Jenkins writes, speculative fiction is especially popular with women who identify with feminism because they reject the gender roles that are traditionally seen in other types of fiction.

Gender

The highlighting of gender in science fiction has varied widely throughout the genre's history. Some writers and artists have challenged their society's gender norms in producing their work; others have not. Speculative and science fiction fandoms have generally become less proportionately male over time.  In step with this, so have the casts of characters portrayed in fiction; similarly, considerations of gender in speculative and science fiction have increased in frequency and nuance over time.

Influence of political movements
The study of women within science fiction in the last decades of the twentieth century was driven in part by the feminist and gay liberation movements, and has included strands of the various related and spin-off movements, such as gender studies and queer theory.

In the 1970s, a number of events began to focus on women in fandom, professional science fiction, and as characters. In 1974, Pamela Sargent published an influential anthology, Women of Wonder: Science Fiction Stories by Women, About Women—the first of many anthologies to come that focused on women or gender rules. Additionally, movement among writers concerned with feminism and gender roles sprang up, leading to a genre of "feminist science fiction" including Joanna Russ' 1975 The Female Man, Samuel R. Delany's 1976 Trouble on Triton: An Ambiguous Heterotopia, and Marge Piercy's 1976 Woman on the Edge of Time.

The 1970s also saw a vibrant gay liberation movement, which made its presence known in science fiction, with gay/lesbian and gay/lesbian-friendly panels at conventions and articles in fanzines; gay/lesbian content increasingly present in the fiction itself; the gay/lesbian bookstore "A Different Light", which took its name from Elizabeth A. Lynn's novel of the same name;  and a focus on LGBT issues in the pages of feminist publications.

More recently, the 2010s have sparked a rebirth for speculative fiction. This revival of the genre can be attributed to the political chaos that came with the 2016 election in which Donald J. Trump won the U.S. presidency. Margaret Atwood's speculative science fiction novel The Handmaid's Tale was adapted into a television series Hulu special and saw such success that it was renewed for a second season. Many critics made the connection between The Handmaid's Tale and President Trump's America in multiple reviews of the series. The fears that came with such a controversial election have given way to a revival of speculative fiction in the 2010s.

Media adaptations
Margaret Atwood's The Handmaid's Tale was adapted into a film in 1990, directed by Volker Schlöndorff. The film received a 31% positive review on Rotten Tomatoes with an average rating of 4.8/10.

The Handmaid's Tale was also adapted into a ten-episode television series Hulu special released on April 26, 2017. The series saw such success that it was renewed for a second season set to release in April 2018.

Octavia Butler's speculative science/fantasy fiction novel Dawn, the first in her trilogy titled Lilith's Brood, is currently being adapted for television by producers Ava DuVernay and Charles D. King's Macro Ventures alongside writer Victoria Mahoney. There is no projected release date for the adaptation yet.

See also
 Feminist science fiction
 Janus (science fiction magazine)
 The Witch and the Chameleon
 Wiscon

Notes

References
(Archive.org) Index to Female Writers In Science Fiction, Fantasy & Utopia: 18th Century to the Present
 Badami, Mary Kenny. "A Feminist Critique of Science Fiction," Extrapolation 18 (Dec. 1978), pp. 6–19.
 
 Larbalestier, Justine. The Battle of the Sexes in Science Fiction. Wesleyan University Press, Middleton, Connecticut, 2002.
 Merrick, Helen. "From Female Man to Feminist fan: Uncovering 'Herstory' in the Annals of SF Fandom." in Women of Other Worlds: Excursions through Science Fiction and Feminism, edited by Helen Merrick and Tess Williams, University of Western Australia Press: Nedlands, 1999: pp. 115–139.
 -- The Secret Feminist Cabal: A Cultural History of Science Fiction Feminisms. Seattle: Aqueduct Press, 2009. 

 
Science fiction culture
Gender in speculative fiction